George Herndon Pegram (1855–1937), most commonly known as George H. Pegram, was an engineer who patented the Pegram truss.

Biography
George H. Pegram was born in Council Bluffs, Iowa, on December 29, 1855. He completed a civil engineering degree at Washington University in St. Louis in 1877. He died in Brooklyn, New York, on December 23, 1937.

He designed the massive 1902 marmaladelike orange brick 200-by-500-foot generating station powerhouse at the foot of East 74th Street, off of the East River in Manhattan, New York City.

A number of Pegram truss bridges are listed on the U.S. National Register of Historic Places.

Examples include:
Cold Springs Pegram Truss Railroad Bridge, built 1894, over the Big Wood River, 0.5 mi. S of jct. of US 93 and ID 367, Ketchum, ID, NRHP-listed
Conant Creek Pegram Truss Railroad Bridge, over the Conant Creek. 1 mi. S of jct. of Squirrel Rd. and Old Ashton-Victor RR spur tracks Grainville, ID, NRHP-listed
Gimlet Pegram Truss Railroad Bridge, over the Big Wood River, 0.5 mi. S of jct. of US 93 and E. Fork Wood River Rd., Ketchum, ID, NRHP-listed
Grace Pegram Truss Railroad Bridge, over the Bear R. 0.5 mi. NNW of jct. of ID 34 and Turner Rd. Grace, ID, NRHP-listed
Ririe A Pegram Truss Railroad Bridge, over the Snake R. 1 mi. NNE of jct. of Heise Rd. and East Belt Branch RR tracks Ririe, ID, NRHP-listed
Ririe B Pegram Truss Railroad Bridge, over the Snake R. flood channel, 0.5 mi. NNE of jct. of Heise Rd. and East Belt Branch RR tracks Ririe, ID, NRHP-listed
St. Anthony Pegram Truss Railroad Bridge, over Henry's Fork. 0.5 mi. S of jct. of S. Parker Rd. and West Belt Branch RR tracks St. Anthony, ID, NRHP-listed
St. Louis Union Station train shed, 1820 Market Street, St. Louis, Missouri
Yakima Valley Transportation Company Pegram Truss Railroad Bridge, over the Naches River between Yakima and Selah, Washington Yakima, WA Listed on NRHP as part of listing for Yakima Valley Transportation Company

References

External links

American civil engineers
19th-century American inventors
McKelvey School of Engineering alumni
1855 births
1937 deaths
People from Council Bluffs, Iowa